Tripartite motif-containing protein 16 is a protein that in humans is encoded by the TRIM16 gene.

This gene was identified as an estrogen and anti-estrogen regulated gene in epithelial cells stably expressing estrogen receptor. The protein encoded by this gene contains two B box domains and a coiled-coiled region that are characteristic of the B box zinc finger protein family. 

The proteins of this family have been reported to be involved in a variety of biological processes including cell growth, differentiation and pathogenesis. Expression of this gene was detected in most tissues. Its function, however, has not yet been determined.

References

Further reading